Lagos Talks is a radio station in Lagos, Nigeria, broadcasting on 91.3 MHz FM. Owned by Megalectrics Limited, it broadcasts a talk radio format targeted at a demographic of between 18-45 years.

It was launched on 22 September 2016.

References 

2016 establishments in Nigeria
Radio stations established in 2016
Radio stations in Lagos